Monaco Heliport, also known as Monte Carlo Heliport, is a heliport situated in the district of Fontvieille in the Principality of Monaco. The heliport is the only aviation facility within Monaco. It was opened with the support of Prince Rainier III in 1976, with only one helipad, later expanded. The only scheduled destination is Nice Côte d'Azur Airport in Nice, France. Both arrivals and departures are routed over the water, to minimize noise.

Location

The heliport is located directly on the Mediterranean coastline in the vicinity of the Stade Louis II.

Facilities

The heliport has been expanded to eight pads since its opening in 1987, with pads A and B jutted out over the sea. There is a single terminal structure at the heliport, and four hangar facilities, three on the east and one on the west side of the heliport. There is also an underground parking lot, and a drop-off area at the front of the terminal.

The heliport is managed by the Direction de l'Aviation Civile and Security is provided the Division de Police Maritime et Aéroportuaire, a subdivision of the Direction de la Sûreté Publique.

Airlines and destinations

Airlines offering scheduled flights to Nice airport are Monacair, Heli Air Monaco and Heli Securite Nice Côte d'Azur Airport in Nice. Many passengers arrive at NCE by plane and connect via helicopter as this is the fastest (but most costly) option to get to Monaco from further away.

Ground transportation
Shuttle buses provide connections to and from the heliport with major hotels and many other locations within Monaco. Compagnie des Autobus de Monaco operates two bus routes, which stop in the vicinity of the heliport.

References

Aviation in Monaco
Heliports
Transport buildings and structures in Monaco
1976 establishments in Monaco
Fontvieille, Monaco